CHI Health (formerly Alegent Health) is a regional healthcare network headquartered in Omaha. The combined organization consists of 28 hospitals, two stand-alone behavioral health facilities, and more than 150 employed physician practices in Iowa, Minnesota, Nebraska, and North Dakota. CHI Health is part of CommonSpirit Health and is legally designated a non-profit organization.

History 
Alegent Health was created in 1996, resulting from the merger between the Lutheran Immanuel Medical Center and the Catholic Bergan Mercy Medical Center under the Community Health Vision. Also merged were Mercy Hospital in Council Bluffs, Iowa, and two regional health partners, Corning and Schuyler, each retaining their religious affiliations. In 1997, Midlands Hospital was also absorbed.

Mergers and acquisitions
In 2012, Alegent acquired Creighton University Medical Center and renamed it as Alegent Creighton Health. Also in 2012, Immanuel left the Alegent partnership to focus on its senior programs and Alegent became solely sponsored by Catholic Health Initiatives. In 2014, Alegent Creighton Health merged with CHI Nebraska and was renamed CHI Health.

In February 2019, parent company CHI merged with Dignity Health, forming CommonSpirit Health, the second-largest nonprofit hospital chain in the United States.

Hospitals

See also 
 Hospitals in Omaha, Nebraska
 CHI Health Center Omaha, the city's largest indoor sports venue, bearing the company's name due to a sponsorship deal

References

External links 

Catholic health care
Health care companies based in Nebraska
Healthcare in Omaha, Nebraska
Hospital networks in the United States
Organizations based in Omaha, Nebraska
Religious corporations
Catholic hospital networks in the United States